Marco Gaeta (born 10 February 1992) is an Italian professional footballer who plays as a forward for Latina Calcio 1932.

Club career
In 2017–18 season Gaeta was signed by Serie D club Gozzano. He was part of the starting lineup with the Group A champion in the grand scudetto playoffs. However, he missed the semi-final. In 2019-20 season play for Serie D club Avezzano.

References

External links
 Marco Gaeta Italian league stats at aic.football.it 
 
 Marco Gaeta international caps at figc.it 
 

1992 births
Living people
Italian footballers
A.C. Renate players
S.S. Teramo Calcio players
A.C.R. Messina players
A.C. Monza players
S.S.D. Sanremese Calcio players
Avezzano Calcio players
Latina Calcio 1932 players
Serie C players
Serie D players
Association football forwards